Jimbo and the Jet-Set  is a British animated cartoon series centered on the eponymous Jimbo, an anthropomorphic aeroplane. The series, created by Peter Maddocks and produced by Maddocks Cartoon Productions, aired for 25 episodes from 6 January 1986 until 6 February 1987.

As stated in its premise, Jimbo was originally intended to be a Jumbo Jet. However, as his designer had never known the difference between inches and centimetres, he resulted in his diminutive size.

The series features various anthropomorphic airport ground vehicles: Tommy Tow-Truck, Claude Catering, Amanda Baggage, Phil the Fuel Truck, Sammy Steps and Harry Helicopter. In addition to these characters, other plane characters appear from time to time, such as Old Timer, a Vickers Wellington bomber who features in the story while flying to or from an airshow; and Gloria, a female counterpart to Jimbo.

The story is based at a fictional "London Airport", under the command of an irate controller who frequently ends episodes exclaiming "I want words with you, Jimbo!" The series finale aired on 6 February 1987.

Credits 
 Created, Written and Produced by Peter Maddocks
 Music Roger Greenaway, Gavin Greenaway
 Series Animation by Clive Dawson, Julian Gibbs, Neil Salmon, William Mobberley
 Backgrounds Kevin Smith
 Camera Chris Williams
 Editing Keith Learner
 Trace & Paint Guy Maddocks, Vivienne Dempsey, Simon Maddocks
 Directed by Keith Learner
 Voices Peter Hawkins & Susan Sheridan

Episodes

Home releases
In 1987, after its debut on the BBC, twelve episodes were released on BBC Video, then reissued by 'Paradox Films' which distributed Total Home Entertainment with under licence from BBC Worldwide Ltd (Cat. No. THE 20003) in 1995.

In 1999, Castle Home Video released all 25 episodes on two videos, but reissued on DVD by Rights Entertainment (distributed by Universal Pictures UK) in 2004 since Castle's VHS versions became out of print in 2002.

External links 
 Toonhound – Jimbo and the Jet Set
 80s Cartoons – Jimbo and the Jet Set
 80sNostalgia.com – Jimbo and the Jet Set
 Jimbo and the Jet Set at ClassicKidsTV.co.uk
 

BBC children's television shows
Fictional aircraft
1980s British children's television series
1986 British television series debuts
1987 British television series endings
Aviation television series
British children's animated adventure television series
English-language television shows
1980s British animated television series